"Dopamina" (English: "Dopamine"), is a song by Spanish-born Mexican singer Belinda released as second and finale single from Carpe Diem on August 10, 2010, on radio stations.

Information 
"Dopamina" was written by Belinda, along with her father Nacho Peregrín, Daniel Barkman and Jörgen Ringqvist, who collaborated in the songs "Wacko" and "Maldita Suerte".

Track listing 
Promotional single and digital download
 "Dopamina" — 3:15

Cultures references 
The song talks about the book, "The Lady of the Camellias", by the French novelist and writer Alexandre Dumas in the verse: << Prefiero aceptar la soledad, que ser la dama de las camelias y morir en la esquizofrenia >>.

Music video 
On August 9, 2010, an unofficial music video was released in her YouTube account directed by Kerry Kendall.

The official music video was filmed on October 23, 2010, at Lagunas de Zempoala. It premiered on February 1 through YouTube, and on February 2 on channel Ritmoson Latino in a half-hour special that included an interview with Belinda, It was released on iTunes on January 28, 2011.

The video will tell a story along with Amor Transgénico, a song dedicated to the gay community, to be released after Dopamina, and you have to see them both so you can understand the whole story. the whole video will last 9 minutes.

Release date

Charts

References

External links 
 

2010 singles
Belinda Peregrín songs
Songs written by Belinda Peregrín
Spanish-language songs
2009 songs
Songs written by Nacho Peregrín
Capitol Latin singles
Songs written by Jörgen Ringqvist